Vinicio Angulo (born July 26, 1988) is an Ecuadorian footballer who plays for D' León in the Ecuadorian Serie B as a forward.

Club career
Vinicio came out as a professional at Barcelona SC. The new head coach of Barcelona SC Benito Floro request Angulo's presence for the motivated project called La Renovacion.

On February 7, 2010 Angulo came as a substitution to replace Luis Miguel Garcés because of injury, he scored his first goal in the majors against Universidad Catolica.

In 2012 the player was transferred to Independiente José Terán of Sangolqui where he scored several goals and had a good performance but because of his lack of discipline was released from the team and began to training with CS North America of Guayaquil in the Ecuadorian 3rd division. In 2012, he was transferred to F.C. Paços de Ferreira of Portugal.

References

External links

Ascenso MX Profile

1988 births
Living people
Sportspeople from Guayaquil
Ecuadorian footballers
C.S.D. Independiente del Valle footballers
Barcelona S.C. footballers
F.C. Paços de Ferreira players
C.S. Emelec footballers
Dorados de Sinaloa footballers
Alebrijes de Oaxaca players
Atlético San Luis footballers
Club León footballers
Manta F.C. footballers
L.D.U. Portoviejo footballers
Guayaquil City F.C. footballers
Primeira Liga players
Ascenso MX players
Liga MX players
Ecuadorian Serie A players
Ecuadorian expatriate footballers
Expatriate footballers in Mexico
Expatriate footballers in Portugal
Association football forwards